The 1987 Athens Open was a men's tennis tournament played on outdoor clay courts in Athens in Greece that was part of the 1987 Nabisco Grand Prix. It was the second edition of the tournament and was held from 15 June until 22 June 1987. Fourth-seeded Guillermo Pérez Roldán won the singles title.

Finals

Singles

 Guillermo Pérez Roldán defeated  Tore Meinecke 6–2, 6–3
 It was Pérez-Roldán's 2nd singles title of the year and of his career.

Doubles

 Tore Meinecke /  Ricki Osterthun defeated  Jaroslav Navrátil /  Tom Nijssen 6–2, 3–6, 6–2
 It was Meinecke's only title of the year and the 1st of his career. It was Osterthun's only title of the year and the 2nd of his career.

See also
 1987 Athens Trophy – women's tournament

References

External links
 ITF tournament edition details

Athens Open
Athens Open
ATP Athens Open
June 1987 sports events in Europe